A Kozyrev mirror, in Russian esoteric literature from 1990s, is a pseudoscientific device made from long sheets of aluminum (sometimes from glass, or reflecting mirror-like material) curled into a cylindrical spiral.  It is alleged to focus different types of radiation, including that coming from biological objects, when those objects are placed inside of it.  Kozyrev mirrors were used in experiments related to extrasensory perception (ESP), conducted in the Institute of Experimental Medicine of Siberia, division of the Russian Academy of Sciences.

Name 
This device is named after the astronomer Nikolai Aleksandrovich Kozyrev, but it was neither invented nor described by him.

Reported uses 

Humans, placed into the spirals, allegedly experienced anomalous psycho-physical sensations.

Kozyrev mirrors were shown in a documentary on the Russian state TV channel and articles about them were published in tabloid newspapers in Russia and Ukraine but not in scientific journals.

There is a claim that during one of early experiments in the arctic village of Dixon, scientists placed an ancient symbol of Trinity into a mirror installation, and perceived a field of force around the setup. The experiment was led by Vlail Kaznacheev, of the Russian Academy of Medical Science.

References 

Pseudoscience
Mirrors